Roger Parker (died 1355) was a Canon of Windsor from 1353 to 1355

Career

He was appointed:
Rector of North Stoke, Oxfordshire.

He was appointed to the fourth stall in St George's Chapel, Windsor Castle in 1353 and held the canonry until 1355 and was supervisor from 1354.

His brass memorial exists in North Stoke, Oxfordshire.

Notes 

1355 deaths
Canons of Windsor
Year of birth unknown